"I Like It Like That" is a song by American rock band Hot Chelle Rae. It was released as the second single from their second album Whatever on October 4, 2011. "I Like It Like That" was released to mainstream radio on September 27, 2011. The song features vocals from American hip hop group New Boyz. The song peaked at number 28 on the Billboard Hot 100 in the U.S.

Music video
A music video to accompany the release of "I Like It Like That" was first released on October 7, 2011, at a total length of three minutes and thirty-one seconds.
The video has since reached almost 30 million views.

Edited version
The song has been used and promoted to kids on Radio Disney. There is an edited or "clean" version of the song that replaces "damn" with "yeah" or "hey", "make the girls take it all off" with "all the girls singing along", "as the cops roll up" with "as my friends roll up", "bought out the bar" with "valet'd the car", and "drinks on me" with "follow me".

Track listing
Digital download
I Like It Like That (feat. New Boyz) – 3:08
I Like It Like That (Goldstein Remix) – 4:30
I Like It Like That (Vanguard Remix) – 3:44

Charts

Certifications

References 

2011 singles
Hot Chelle Rae songs
New Boyz songs
Songs written by E. Kidd Bogart
Songs written by Lindy Robbins
Songs written by Emanuel Kiriakou
2011 songs
Songs written by Andrew Goldstein (musician)
RCA Records singles